Paul Broadbent (born 24 May 1968), also known by the nickname "Beans", is an English former professional rugby league footballer who played in the 1990s and 2000s, and has coached in the 2000s, 2010s and 2020s. He's inspired many with his speech about 'stepping over the line'.

Paul Broadbent won caps for England while at Sheffield Eagles in 1995 against France, in the 1995 Rugby League World Cup against Fiji, and South Africa (sub), in 1996 against France, and Wales. He also won caps for Great Britain while at Sheffield Eagles in 1996 against Papua New Guinea, Fiji, and New Zealand (3 matches).

Paul Broadbent's Testimonial match at Sheffield Eagles took place in 1997.

In the 1997 post season, Broadbent was selected to play for Great Britain at prop forward in all three matches of the Super League Test series against Australia.

Broadbent played left- in Sheffield Eagles' 17-8 victory over Wigan Warriors in the 1998 Challenge Cup Final during Super League III at Wembley Stadium, London on Saturday 2 May 1998.

He has previously coached Italy in their European Championship B matches 2012-15. Cameron Ciraldo will take over for the World Cup Qualifying matches.

Paul Broadbent is the father of the rugby league footballer for the Sheffield Eagles; Blake Broadbent.

References

External links
 (archived by web.archive.org) Profile at wakefieldwildcats.co.uk
 (archived by web.archive.org) Stats → PastPlayers → B at hullfc.com
 (archived by web.archive.org) Statistics at hullfc.com

1968 births
Living people
England national rugby league team players
English rugby league coaches
English rugby league players
Great Britain national rugby league team players
Halifax R.L.F.C. players
Hull F.C. players
Italy national rugby league team coaches
Rugby league props
Sheffield Eagles (1984) players
Wakefield Trinity coaches
Wakefield Trinity players
York City Knights coaches
York City Knights players